The Letters of Sacco and Vanzetti is a 1928 collection of letters written by Nicola Sacco and Bartolomeo Vanzetti.

Contents 

Their correspondence addresses famous figures including H. G. Wells and Theodore Dreiser. An appendix aggregates events during the case, their courtroom speeches, and Vanzetti's final statement.

Publication 

Marion Frankfurter co-edited the book while her husband, Felix Frankfurter, who would become a United States Supreme Court Justice, taught at Harvard. He had written in support of Sacco and Vanzetti. Gardner Jackson, giving departing Massachusetts Governor Alvan T. Fuller an inscribed copy in January 1929, instead saw the governor knock the book to the ground upon seeing its title.

Constable released the book in the United Kingdom on March 21, 1929.

Vanguard Press, in a different edition, reprinted the letters in 1930 on the third anniversary of Sacco and Vanzetti's deaths. The New York Herald Tribune book editor considered the letters "great literature among the most moving letters ever written" to be remembered even after fiction of the era fades. He found their poetry skilled even with their limited command of the English language.

References

Bibliography

External links 

 
 

1928 non-fiction books
English-language books
Collections of letters
Viking Press books
Works about Sacco and Vanzetti